Simira wurdackii is a species of plant in the family Rubiaceae. It is endemic to Peru.

References

wurdackii
Vulnerable plants
Trees of Peru
Taxonomy articles created by Polbot